Mount Everett at 2,608 ft - or 793.1 m - is the highest peak in the south Taconic Mountains. Everett rises nearly 2,000 feet in about a mile from its eastern footings around Sheffield, Mass., and is known for its expansive views; for scrubby old-growth vegetation (pitch pine and scrub oak) on its upper reaches and for the Appalachian Trail's north-south traverse of the mountain. Prior to the 20th century, Mount Everett was also called Mt. Taughanuk and Dome of the Taconics.

Details
Guilder Pond, a highland lake, is located between Mount Everett and Undine Mountain to the north; Race Brook Falls, a popular series of waterfalls, cascades from a common ledge between Mount Everett and Mount Race to the south, losing approximately 600 feet of elevation in 1200 feet of brook. A seasonal auto road climbs to just short of the summit, though the road's upper reaches have been closed to motorized vehicles for many years.

The summit and west side of Mount Everett is located in the town of Mount Washington; the east slopes are located in Sheffield, Massachusetts. Much of the mountain is located within the Mount Everett State Reservation; other parcels are part of Mount Washington State Forest or conservation easements.

The summit contains a rare dwarf Pitch Pine tree community.  Not only are the pines rare on summits across the northeast, they typically occur in locations where fire is frequent and there is no evidence of fire on the Mount Everett summit.

The east side of the mountain drains into Race Brook, thence into Schenob Brook, the Hubbard Brook, the Housatonic River, and Long Island Sound. The west side drains into Guilder Brook and City Brook, thence into Bash Bish Brook, the Roeliff Jansen Kill, the Hudson River and New York Bay of the Atlantic Ocean.

History of nomenclature

The name "Mount Everett" was proposed in 1841 by Edward Hitchcock in his "Final Report on the Geology of Massachusetts." Hitchcock reported  that the mountain was "often confounded" with the local town of Mount Washington, Mass., where Hitchcock said it was known as Bald Mountain or Ball Mountain, "but in neighboring towns, I believe this name is rarely given."

Hitchcock, chief of the Massachusetts Geological Survey and an Amherst College professor, implied that his authoritative account of 1841 nomenclature for the peak was complete. However, Timothy Dwight IV, eighth president of Yale College and a once-prominent author, had used the name  "Taughanuk Mountain" in his posthumous 1823 memoir, Travels in New England and New York, which included a brief account of Dwight's 1781 ascent of the mountain. Hitchcock ignored this publication — and proposed naming the peak after Edward Everett, governor of Massachusetts (1836-1840) who later served as Harvard president, U.S. senator and U.S. secretary of state.

As of 1886,  "there [had] long been a protest against adopting the name that Prof. Hitchcock gave to the summit," according to Clark W. Bryan's tourist guide titled Book of the Berkshires. This book (1886) asserted that 
"the united public sentiment of the region" favored  Dome of the Taconics ("often abbreviated to The Dome"). To confirm the claim of a long-standing controversy, Bryan purported to quote an unpublished 1850 comment (in verse) by the novelist Catharine Sedgwick of Stockbridge, Mass. (1789-1867). Sedgwick favored "The Dome,"  according to this quote.

Bryan, founder of Good Housekeeping magazine (1885),  offered descriptions of the mountain (and its environs) in several separate passages of his guidebook, referring to it exclusively as "The Dome." Yet the United States Board on Geographic Names in 1897 formally accepted the term "Mount Everett," citing four published sources that employed Hitchcock's proposal. It listed a half-dozen alternate names as of 1897: Bald Dome, Bald Peak, Dome Peak, Mount Washington, Takonnack Mountain and Taughanuk Mountain. The name "Mount Everett" has since then appeared on all editions of federal survey maps for the region.

References

Massachusetts Trail Guide (2004). Boston: Appalachian Mountain Club.

External links
South Taconic Range trail map.
Mount Washington State Forest. Massachusetts DCR.
  Mount Everett State Reservation. Massachusetts Department of Conservation and Recreation.
Mount Washington State Forest map
Berkshire Natural Resource Council
Berkshire Chapter of the Appalachian Mountain Club
Commonwealth Connections proposal PDF download. Retrieved March 2, 2008.
Appalachian Trail Conservancy.

Taconic Mountains
Mountains of Berkshire County, Massachusetts